Fernando Luna (born May 12, 1990) is an Argentine rugby sevens player. He was selected for 's sevens squad for the 2016 Summer Olympics.

References

External links 
 
 
 
 
 
 UAR Profile

1990 births
Living people
Male rugby sevens players
Argentine rugby union players
Olympic rugby sevens players of Argentina
Argentina international rugby sevens players
Rugby sevens players at the 2016 Summer Olympics
Pan American Games medalists in rugby sevens
Pan American Games silver medalists for Argentina
Rugby sevens players at the 2015 Pan American Games
Argentina international rugby union players
Rugby sevens players at the 2019 Pan American Games
Medalists at the 2015 Pan American Games
Medalists at the 2019 Pan American Games